New York's 33rd State Senate district is one of 63 districts in the New York State Senate. It has  been represented by Democrat Gustavo Rivera since 2011, following his victory over incumbent Pedro Espada Jr. in the 2010 Democratic primary elections.

Geography
District 33 covers many neighborhoods in the central and south Bronx, including Kingsbridge Heights, Tremont, East Tremont, Crotona, Fordham, Belmont, Van Nest, and Morris Park.

The district overlaps with New York's 13th, 14th, and 15th congressional districts, and with the 77th, 78th, 79th, 80th, 81st, 86th, and 87th districts of the New York State Assembly.

Recent election results

2020

2018

2016

2014

2012

Federal results in District 33

References

33